This is a list of radio stations in the Netherlands.

National

Public
Public radio in the Netherlands is provided jointly by a number of broadcasting organizations operating within the framework of the Netherlands Public Broadcasting (NPO). News bulletins on all stations are provided by NOS.

All of the stations below are also available on digital satellite, digital terrestrial and cable television.

National FM and DAB 

 NPO Radio 1: News, politics, current affairs and sport
 NPO Radio 2: Popular music, mostly from the 1970s, 1980s, 1990s and Dutch music for 35-55 year olds
 NPO 3FM: Pop and rock music for 15-35 year-olds
 NPO Radio 4: Classical music

National DAB 

 NPO Radio 2 Soul & Jazz: Classic soul and jazz music.
 NPO 3FM KX Radio: Station for new radio talent
 NPO Radio 5: Music from the 1950s to 1980s for 55 year-olds and over 
 NPO Radio 5 Sterren NL: Music by Dutch artists
 NPO Fun X: Urban and world music. Available on FM in Amsterdam, Rotterdam, The Hague and Utrecht, with some local programming variations.

Cable only 
 Tweede kamerlijn: Live relays from the Dutch House of Representatives

Commercial

National FM and DAB 

Most of the stations below are also available on digital satellite, digital terrestrial and cable television.

 Kavel A1: Sky Radio: Pop music on 101.0 - 101.9 FM
 Kavel A2: Radio Veronica: Pop and rock from the 1980s, 1990s and 2000s on 102.9 - 103.5 FM
 Kavel A3: Qmusic: Feel good pop music on 100.4 and 100.7 FM
 Kavel A4: BNR Nieuwsradio: News and business news with main frequencies 91.3, 95.4 and 100.0 FM
 Kavel A5: SLAM!: Pop and dance music with main frequencies 88.4, 91.1 and 99.6 FM
 Kavel A6: Radio 538: Current hits, rock and dance music station on 102.1 - 102.7 FM
 Kavel A7: Radio 10: Music from the 1960s to the 1990s with main frequencies 87.6, 87.7, 103.8 and 104.1 FM
 Kavel A8: Sublime FM: Soul, funk, jazz and lounge on 88.8 - 90.9 FM
 Kavel A9: 100% NL: Music by Dutch bands and artists with main frequencies 90.2, 92.1, 99.1, 104.4 and 104.6 FM

National DAB 

 4ever49 Radio: Feel good music
 Arrow Classic Rock: Classic rock
 BBC World Service: English service of international news
 BG Radio: Bulgarian music
 Classicnl: Classical music
 God Radio: Religious programming
 Grand Prix Radio: Music and F1 updates
 Groot Nieuws Radio: Religious programming
 KINK ALT ROCK: Alternative music
 KINK Classics: Classic rock
 Qmusic non-stop: Non-stop feel good pop music
 Radio 10 60s&70s: Music from the 1960s and 1970s
 538 NON STOP: Non-stop current hits
 Sky Radio Hits: Non-stop hit music
 Sunlight: Soft pop and love songs
Tomorrowland OWR: Dance music
Vibe Radio: Urban music. Available on FM in Amsterdam, Rotterdam and The Hague.

Cable only stations 
A number of additional stations are carried on the Netherlands' leading cable television suppliers:
NETHERLANDS: Arrow Classic Rock, Concertzender, Effeling Kids Radio plus all regional public radio stations.
BELGIUM (VRT): VRT Radio 1, VRT Radio 2, Studio Brussel, Klara, NMN.
GREAT BRITAIN (BBC): BBC Radio 1, BBC Radio 2, BBC Radio 3, BBC Radio 4.
GERMANY: Deutsche Welle.

Other local Dutch commercial stations and public stations from across Europe are available along with a selection of themed music channels.

Regional

Regional Commercial Networks 

Regional and local commercial networks
 Kavel B01 and B06: Radio Decibel
Alkmaar FM 98.3, Amsterdam 98.0, Den Haag 98.0, Rotterdam 97.6 and Utrecht 97.3.

 Kavel B02: Wild FM
Alkmaar FM 96.3, Almere 97.4, Amsterdam 93.6 and Haarlem 97.3.

 Kavel B03, B08, B09, B12, B13, B16, B17, B18, B19, B20, B22, B24, B31, B34 and B38: RADIONL
Alkmaar FM 104.2, Amsterdam 94.9, Apeldoorn 88.7 and 94.0, Arnhem 89.6, Assen 97.1, Bathmen 93.1, Breda 104.3, Cuijk 95.3, Den Bosch 94.1, 
Den Haag 99.4, Den Helder 94.5, Dokkum 96.3, Drachten 96.0, Duiven 95.5, Ede 96.0, Eindhoven 90.3, Elst 88.5, Emmen 89.9, Enschede 93.3,
Groningen 104.4, Hardenberg 93.4, Helmond 90.5, Hengelo 98.0, Hoogersmilde 104.2, Hoogeveen 97.0, Leeuwarden 96.6, Leiden 93.7, Lelystad 89.4, 
Loon op Zand 93.3, Markelo 93.5, Meppel 95.7, Nijmegen 94.2, Ommen 93.1, Oosterwolde 96.9, Oss 90.1, Oude Polder 92.4, Roosendaal 97.3,
Rotterdam 99.6, Sneek 94.3, Stadskanaal 96.7, Tjerkgaast 94.1, Utrecht 98.5, Vlissingen 89.3, Winschoten 96.9, Zieuwent/Ruurlo 101.9, 
and Zwolle 89.2 and 97.2.

 Kavel B04: 247Spice
Amsterdam FM 90.1.

 Kavel B04: Ujala Radio
Amsterdam FM 93.3.

 Kavel B05: Qmusic Non-stop
Alkmaar FM 95.4, Almere 95.9, Alphen 95.9, Amsterdam 95.7, Den Haag 95.6, Gouda 95.9, Hilversum 95.9, Naaldwijk 96.0, Utrecht 103.4 and Zoetermeer 95.7.

 Kavel B07: Amor FM
Den Haag FM 89.8 and Rotterdam 102.3.

 Kavel B10: Waterstad FM
Drachten FM 93.5, Emmeloord 101.8, Heerenveen 92.8 and Irnsum 93.2.

 Kavel B10 and B35: Frysk FM
Heerenveen FM 97.3 and Leeuwarden 101.8

 Kavel B11, B26, B28, B30, B32, B33 and B36: Radio Continu
Amersfoort FM 99.5, Deventer 89.9, Emmen 92.3, Eext 92.6, Hoogersmilde 104.7, Hoogezand 92.4, Irnsum 98.2, Ommen 92.4, Sneek 97.9, Terschelling 97.7, 
Wieringermeer 96.0, Winterswijk 94.3, Zieuwent 95.7 and Zuidwolde 92.7.

 Kavel B14 and B37: Simone FM
Appingedam FM 103.6, Emmen 101.7, Groningen 92.9, Hoogezand 91.3, Stadskanaal 91.3 and Winschoten 93.0.

 Kavel B15: Grunn FM
Groningen FM 89.1.

 Kavel B16 and B18: Joy Radio
Enschede FM 87.6, Groningen 98.5, Hoogeveen 98.9, Smilde 98.7 and Tjerkgaast 98.5.

 Kavel B21: Radio 10 Brabant
Breda FM 89.2, Den Bosch 88.9 and 97.4, Eindhoven 89.3, Helmond 95.5, Roosendaal 93.9, Tilburg 103.6, Waalwijk 88.8 and Weert 95.2.

 Kavel B23: Radio JND
Eindhoven FM 93.2 and 93.6.

 Kavel B25: Qmusic Limburg
Eys FM 98.1, Landgraaf 97.7, Maastricht 97.6, Roermond 96.1, Weert 98.5.

 Kavel B29: Tukker FM
Oldenzaal FM 90.0.

 Kavel B34: Team FM
Stadskanaal FM 96.0.

 Kavel C12: Vahon Hindustani Radio
The Hague MW 1566.

Drenthe 
Regional public

 Radio Drenthe: (FM 90.8, 99.3)

Local public

 DNO Radio: (FM 104.8 Zuidwolde)
 Omroep Assen FM: (FM 107.8 Assen)
 Radio AA en Hunze: (FM 105.6 Aa and Hunze)
 Radio Hoogeveen: (FM 106.8 Hoogeveen)
 RTV Borger-Odoorn: (FM 107.5 Borger)
 RTV Meppel: (FM 93.0 Meppel)
 RTV Zulthe: (FM 105.3 Marum)
 Tynaarlo Lokaal: (FM 105.9 Paterswolde, 107.4 Zuidlaren)
 ZO!34: (FM 107.6 Emmen, 105.4 Coevorden, 106.3 Zweloo)

Flevoland 
Regional public

 Radio Flevoland: (FM 89.8)

Local public

 Easy 95.5 FM: (FM 95.5 Almere)
 LOZ Radio: (FM 106.4 Zeewolde)
 Radio Lelystad: (FM 90.3 Lelystad)
 RTV 527: (FM 105.2 Emmeloord)
 Urk FM: (FM 107.0 Urk)

Friesland 
Regional public

 Omreop Fryslân: (FM 92.2, 92.5)

Local public

 Omroep LEO Middelse: (FM 105.3 Steins, 106.1 Leeuwarden)
 Omroep Odrie: (FM 106.9 Appelscha)
 Omroep RSH: (FM 106.2 Harlingen)
 Radio Centraal (Weststellingwerf): (FM 105.0 Wolvega, 107.4 Noordwolde)
 Radio Eenhorn: (FM 107.5 Waadhoeke)
 RTV IJsselmond: (FM 106.4)
 RTV Kanaal 30: (FM 105.0 Burgum)
 RTV NOF: (FM 105.8 Oudwoude, 107.0 Dokkum)
 Radio Spannenburg: (FM 96.4 Balk)
 Smelne FM: (FM 106.5 Drachten)
 WEEFF Radio: (FM 103.9 West Friesland)

Gelderland 
Regional public

 Radio Gelderland: (FM 88.9 Arnhem/Nijmegen, 90.4 Achterhoek, 99.6 Betuwe, 103.5 Veluwe)

Local public

 A1 Radio: (FM 93.5 Barneveld, 106.8 Nijkerk)
 AFM: (FM 107.2 Aalten)
 B-FM: (FM 106.1 Zutphen)
 Ede FM: (FM 107.3 Ede)
 Extra FM: (FM 107.2 West Maas en Waal)
 Favoriet FM: (FM  94.0 Zevenaar, Doesburg, Westervoort and Duiven, 104.9 Groot Doesburg)
 Gelre FM: (FM 105.3, 105.7, 106.1, 106.4, 107.1, 107.5 East Gelre and Berkelland)
 Leuk FM: (FM 106.0 Berkelland, 106.9 East Gelre)
 LOE FM: (FM 105.5 Elburg)
 Loco FM: (FM 107.2 Oldebroek, 107.6 Wezep/Hattemerbroek)
 Omroep Berg en Dal: (FM 90.6, 107.1 Berg en Dal)
 Optimaal FM: (FM 94.7 Vethuizen, 105.5 Varsseveld, 105.6 MHz Didam, 106.2 Doetinchem)
 Radio Hattern: (FM 106.1 Hattern)
 Radio Ideaal: (FM 105.1, 105.4, 105.8, 106.5, 107.7 Bronckhorst)
 RTV Voorst: (FM 105.3, 107.5 Veluwezoom)
 Rijnstreek FM: (FM 106.0 Wageningen)
 RN7: (FM 105.4, 105.7, 106.8, 107.0, 107.4, 107.8 Nijmegen)
 RTV 794: (FM 106.5 Heerde, 107.8 Epe)
 RTV Apeldoorn: (FM 105.5 Hoenderloo, 106.3 Uddel, 107.1 Apeldoorn)
 RTV Arnhem: (FM 105.9 Arnhem)
 RTV Nunspeet (FM 105.9 Nunspeet)
 RTV Slingeland: (FM 105.0 Winterswijk)
 RTV Veluwezoom: (FM 107.5 Brummen)
 SRC FM: (FM 95.6 Vijfheerenlanden, 105.1 Buren, 105.8 Culemborg, 106.2 West Betuwe)
 Studio Rheden: (FM 106.9 Dieren, Spankeren, Laag-Soeren and Ellecom, 107.2 Velp, Rozendaal, Rheden and De Steeg)
 Veluwe FM: (FM 105.0 Ermelo, 106.1 Putten, 107.7 Harderwijk)

Groningen 
Regional public

 Radio Noord: (FM 97.5 Groningen)

Local public

 OOG Radio: (FM 106.6 Groningen, 107.0 Haren)
 REGIO FM: (FM 95.3 Bedum, 105.2 Hoogezand, 106.1 Siddeburen, 107.2 Slochteren, 107.6 Muntendam, 107.9 Scharmer)
 RTV 1: (FM 105.3 Stadskanaal, 106.9 Veendam)
 RTV GO!: (FM 105.8 Winschoten)
 RTV Zulthe: (FM 105.3 Marum)
 Radio Westerwolde: (FM 106.5 Ter Apel, 106.6 Bellingwolde, 107.0 Vlagtwedde, 107.3 Pekela)

Limburg 
Regional public

 L1 Radio: (FM 95.3 Hulsberg, 100.3 Roermond and cable)

Local public

 3Heuvelland: (FM 105.8 Maasdal, 107.2 Heuvelland)
 Bie Os: (FM 96.2 Urmond, 99.1 Geleen, 107.3 Sittard)
 Falcon Radio: (FM 94.3 Valkenburg)
 Maasland Radio: (FM 89.6 Nieuw-Bergen, 92.9 Wellerlooi, 107.7 Gennep)
 ML5 Radio: (FM 105.7 Heythuysen, 106.1 Maasbracht, 107.4 Roermond)
 Omreop Horst aan de Maas: (FM 107.1 Horst)
 Omroep P&M: (FM 92.5 Beesel)
 Omroep Venlo: (FM 96.9 Venlo)
 Omroep Venray: (FM 90.2 Veulen)
 RTV Maastricht: (FM 107.5 Maastricht)
 RTV Parkstad: (FM 89.2 Landgraaf)
 Weert FM: (FM 97.0 Nederweert, 107.5 Weert)

North Brabant 
Regional public

 Omroep Brabant

Local public

 Lokaal 7: (FM 107.4 Sint-Michielsgestel)
 OKÉ FM : (FM 106.4 FM Aalburg)
 Boschtion FM: (FM 95.2 s'-Hertogenbosch and cable)
 Radio 8FM: (FM 89.2 Breda, 103.6 Tilburg, 97.4 Den Bosch, 89.3 Eindhoven, 95.2 Weert and cable)
 Radio Mexico: (FM 106.1 's-Hertogenbosch)
 Royaal FM: (FM 93.6 Eindhoven)

North Holland 
Regional public

 NH Radio: (FM 88.9 Amsterdam, 88.7 Hilversum, 93.9 Alkmaar and cable)

Local public

 Caribbean FM: (FM 107.9 Amsterdam)
 Haarlem105: (FM 89.9 FM Haarlem)
 LOS Den Helder Radio: (FM 105.6 Den Helder)
 MeerRadio: (FM 105.5, 106.6 Haarlemmermeer)
 Noordkop Central: (FM 107.7 Schagen)
 On The Real FM: (FM 88.1 Haarlem)
 Radio Aalsmeer: (FM 105.9 Aalsmeer and Kudelstaart)
 Radio SALTO: (FM 99.4, 106.8 Amsterdam)
 Razo: (FM 105.2 Amsterdam)
 Rick FM: (FM 106.3 Uithoorn and De Kwakel)
 RTV80: (FM 105.9 Bergen, Egmond and Schoorl)
 RTV Noordkop: (FM 106.6 Hollands Kroon)
 RTV Zaanstreek: (FM 107.1 Zaandam)
 Studio DMN: (FM 106.1 Diemen)
 ZFM: (FM 106.9 Zandvoort)

Overijssel  
Regional public

 Radio Oost: (FM 99.4 North West Overijssel, 97.9 Deventer, 95.6 Zuid Salland, 89.4 Twente and cable, DTT and satellite)

Local public

 DNO Radio: (FM 106.6 North Overijssel)
 Radio 350: (FM 92.3 Rijssen and cable)

South Holland  
Regional public

 Radio West  89.30 FM
 Radio Rijnmond

Local public

 Den Haag FM: (FM 92.0 The Hague, cable and DTT)
 OPEN Rotterdam: (FM 93.9 Rotterdam, cable and DTT)
 Sleutelstad FM: (FM 93.7 Leiden and cable)
 RTV Katwijk

Utrecht 
Regional public

 Radio M Utrecht: (FM 93.1, 97.9 Rhenen)

Local public

 Bingo FM: (FM 105.7 Utrecht, 107.9 Amersfoort)
 LOS Radio: (FM 107.5 Bunschoten)
 Midland FM: (FM 104.9 Veenendaal, FM 105.6 Renswoude, FM 106.3 Scherpenzeel)

Zeeland 
Regional public

 Omroep Zeeland

Internet radio 
Many public and commercial radio stations broadcast a number of themed, online sister stations. Most stations broadcast non-stop music with NOS or ANP news bulletins on the hour.

Campus radio

 Feelin Radio (Inholland University, Haarlem)

Public

 NPO Radio 2 (NPO Radio 2 Top 2000, NPO Radio 2 In Concert, NPO Radio 2 Liedkunst, All Day Jazz, EastWestRadio.nl, Sterren.nl)
 NPO 3FM (NPO 3FM Alternative, NPO 3FM Live, NPO 3FM Serious Talent, NPO 3FM Mega Top 50, Xnoizz)
 NPO Radio 4 (AVRO Back to the Old School, AVRO Baroque around the Clock, AVRO Easy Listening, AVRO Klassiek Film, AVRO Het beste van het beste, AVRO Radio Festival Classique, AVRO Steenen Tijdperk Fifties, AVRO Steenen Tijdperk Sixties, AVRO Ziel en Zaligheid, AVRO Operette, IKON Musica Religiosa, IKON Orgelradio, Radio 4 Eigentjids, Radio 4 Jong Klassiek)
 NPO Radio 5 (NPO Radio 5 Nostalgia)
 NPO Radio 6 (NPO Radio 6 Jazz, NPO Radio 6 Jazz Jong, NPO Radio 6 Grooves, NPO Radio 6 Blues, NPO Radio 6 World, NPO Radio 6 Outer Limits, NPO Radio 6 Metropole Orkest)
 FunX (FunX Slow Jamz, FunX Reggae, FunX Hip-Hop, FunX Latin, FunX Arab, FunX Dance, FunX Fusion, EastWestRadio.nl)
 On The Real FM (Hip Hop, beat tapes and breaks from independent musicians and MCs) [onthereal.nl]
 Concertzender (Classical music, early music, jazz, world music, interface, Dutch music media, contemporary music, ambient, gregorian chant, orient express, hard bop, pop, young professionals, folk it!)

Commercial

 Radio 538 (538 Dancedepartment, 538 Hitzone, 538 Juize, 538 Non Stop 40, 538 Party Radio, 53L8)
 Sky Radio (Sky Radio Love Songs, Sky Radio NL, Sky Radio Dance Classics (Jan-Jun), Sky Radio Summer Hits (Jun-Oct), Sky Radio The Christmas Station (Oct-Dec))
 Radio Veronica (Veronica Hitradio, Veronica Rock Radio, Veronica Top 1000 Allertijden, 
 Radio 10 Gold (Radio 10 Gold Disco, Radio 10 Gold Top 4000, Radio 10 Gold 60s and 70s, Radio 10 Gold 80s, Radio 10 Gold 90s)
 Arrow (Arrow Caz)
 Pinguin Radio https://pinguinradio.com/ 
 KX Radio (KX World, KX Classikx, KX Red Hot)
 Kink (Kink, Kink DNA, KinkNL and Kink Distortion)

Premium radio

There were two subscription cable radio services operated in the Netherlands: Music Choice and XLnt Radio. But the two services have since merged after Stingray Digital in Canada acquired them.

XLnt Radio
Previously, XLnt Radio ran 52 full-time music channels and is available through Caiway:

 XLnt Kiddo FM
 XLnt Hip Hop
 XLnt R&B
 XLnt Trance
 XLnt Dance
 XLnt Hits
 XLnt Party
 XLnt Lounge
 XLnt Chill Out
 XLnt Today's Pop
 XLnt Nederpop
 XLnt Arabian Nights
 XLnt Turk
 XLnt Alternative Rock
 XLnt Hard Rock
 XLnt Rock
 XLnt New Age
 XLnt Easy Listening
 XLnt Classic Rock
 XLnt Piratenhits
 XLnt Salsa
 XLnt Dance Classics
 XLnt Comedy
 XLnt Country
 XLnt Love Songs
 XLnt Motown
 XLnt Reggae
 XLnt Italia
 XLnt France
 XLnt Espana
 XLnt Blues
 XLnt Oldies
 XLnt Nederpop Gold
 XLnt Schlager
 XLnt Rock N Roll
 XLnt Classical
 XLnt Jazz
 XLnt Classic Jazz
 XLnt NL Luisterlied
 XLnt Nostalgie
 XLnt Kleuterliedjes
 XLnt Skihut
 XLnt JackFM
 XLnt Film
 XLnt Relipop
 XLnt Christmas
 XLnt Musical
 XLnt Opera
 XLnt Operette
 XLnt Crooners
 XLnt Fanfare
 XLnt Etalagekanaal

Music Choice
Previously, Music Choice ran full-time music channels on the Ziggo and UPC cable networks:

 60s
 70s
 80er - Germany
 80s
 90er - Germany
 90s
 2000s
 All Day Party
 Arabic
 The Alternative - Germany
 The Alternative - UK
 Bass, Breaks & Beats
 Blues
 Bollywood Hits
 Carnival - Germany
 Chansons
 Chillout
 Classic R'n'B & Soul
 Classic Rock
 Classical Calm
 Classical Greats
 Classical India
 Classical Orchestral
 Cocktail Lounge
 Cool Jazz
 Country
 Dancefloor Fillers
 Drive
 East African Gospel
 Freedom
 Freedom - Sweden
 Groove (Disco & Funk)
 Harder Than Hell
 Hindi Gold
 Hip Hop
 Indie Classics
 Jazz Classics
 Kids
 Kids - Germany
 New Age
 Punjabi
 Reggae
 Revival (60s & 70s)
 Revival (60s & 70s)- Germany
 Rewind (80s & 90s)
 Rewind (80s & 90s) - Germany
 Rewind (80s & 90s)- Sweden
 Rock Anthems
 Rock Anthems - Germany
 Rock'n'Roll
 South Africa Gospel
 South Africa Modern
 South Africa Traditional
 Schlager
 Schlager - Sweden
 Silk (Love Songs)
 Sounds of South India
 Swiss Hits
 Total Hits - Belgium (a.k.a. Belpop)
 Total Hits - France
 Total Hits - Germany
 Total Hits - Germany 
 Total Hits - Italy
 Total Hits - East Africa
 Total Hits - Netherlands
 Total Hits - Nordic
 Total Hits - Spain
 Total Hits - Sweden
 Total Hits - UK
 Türk Müzigi
 Trance FM
 Urban
 Urban - Germany
 Volksmusik
 World Carnival
 Xmas / New Years
 Xmas / New Years Germany

Low power AM 
With the cessation of NPO Radio 5's broadcasts on 747 kHz and 1251 kHz in late 2015, the Dutch government opened a public consultation on opening up the medium waveband for low powered broadcasting. In May 2016, it was formally announced that 747, 828, 1035, 1251, and 1395 kHz (previously used by full-power stations) would have a maximum transmission power of 100 watts, while 1485 kHz would have a maximum transmission power of 1 watt.

A current list of AM broadcasters is available at Radio-tv-nederland.nl.

References

External links
 Listen to top radio stations in Nederlands
 Radio stations in the Netherlands (Radiomap.eu)
 FMLIST database of FM stations (select country "HOL" after logging in or continuing as guest)
 Stingray Music (Netherlands)
 List of AM broadcasters from Radio-tv-nederland.nl

Netherlands